Little Bird is the seventh studio album released by the Australian singer Kasey Chambers, released by Liberation Music in Australia on 17 September 2010. The first single of the album is "Little Bird". The album peaked at number three on the Australian ARIA Charts, becoming Chambers' first album to miss the number one spot since her debut album, The Captain, peaked at number eleven in 1999.

Reception

Music critic Alexey Eremenko, in his Allmusic wrote "Little Bird is more old school, as it peppers the pop hits with honest to God country numbers, complete with banjo and fiddle... With Chambers, the music and the words sometimes tether on the brink of cliché, not archetype. But for the most part, she is still able to deliver her tunes with honesty that makes you think about feelings she's conveying, not her recording budgets, as is the case with many over-processed country stars out there."

Track listing

Personnel
Kevin Bennett - duet vocals
Kasey Chambers - vocals
Beccy Cole - duet vocals
Shane Nicholson, Jim Mogine and Bill Chambers - guitar, Stringed Instruments.
John Watson - drums
Jeff McCormack - bass

Charts

Weekly charts

Year-end charts

Certifications

References

ARIA Award-winning albums
Kasey Chambers albums
Albums produced by Shane Nicholson (singer)
2010 albums